Jews have been a part of the Australian parliament since federation. In 2016 a record number of 6 MPs identified as Jewish. When Kerryn Phelps won the 2018 Wentworth by-election the number rose to 7, but subsequently dropped back to 6 following the 2019 Australian federal election.

Federal parliament

State parliaments

New South Wales

Northern Territory

Queensland

South Australia

Tasmania

Victoria

Western Australia

See also 

 List of Jewish governors of Australia

References 

Parliament
Parliament
Members of the Parliament of Australia
Lists of legislators in Australia